Agrotis xiphias is a moth of the family Noctuidae. It was first described by Edward Meyrick in 1899. It is endemic to the Hawaiian islands of Kauai and Maui.

It is a distinctively marked species whose pattern is subject to considerable variation.

External links

Agrotis
Endemic moths of Hawaii
Moths described in 1899